Beutenbergia cavernae is a Gram-positive, non-spore-forming and non-motile species of bacteria from the family of Beutenbergiaceae. Beutenbergia cavernae has been isolated from soil from the Reed Flute Cave in Guilin in China.

References

Micrococcales
Bacteria described in 1999
Monotypic bacteria genera